Pavel Ipatov may refer to:

 Pavel Ipatov (economist) (1914–1994), Soviet economist
 Pavel Ipatov (politician) (born 1950), Russian politician

See also
 Ipatov